The 1st constituency of Guadeloupe is a French legislative constituency in
Guadeloupe, an insular region of France located in the Leeward Islands.

Since 2022, it is represented by Olivier Serva of GUSR.

Deputies

Election results

2022

2017

2012

Sources

 Official results of French elections from 2002: "Résultats électoraux officiels en France" (in French).

References

1